There are nine national parks located in the state of California managed by the National Park Service. National parks protect significant scenic areas and nature reserves, provide educational programs, community service opportunities, and are an important part of conservation efforts in the United States. There are several other locations inside of California managed by the National Park Service, but carry other designations such as National Monuments. Many of the national parks in California are also part of national forests and National Wildlife Refuges, and contain Native American Heritage Sites and National Monuments.

Parks

Channel Islands

The Channel Islands National Park was established on March 5, 1980 and is located on five of the eight Channel Islands off the coast of California; all of the islands are located in Santa Barbara County except Anacapa Island which is located in Ventura County. The park covers a total area of almost . The National Park Service works with various organizations to host educational, conservation, and scientific programs at the park. The five islands which comprise the park are:
 Santa Cruz Island (Spanish: Isla Santa Cruz, Chumash: Limuw) is the largest island in California and largest of the eight islands in the Channel Islands archipelago. It forms part of the northern group of the Channel Islands.
The terrain consists of rolling hills, canyons, and a coastal lagoon.
 Anacapa Island is the smallest of the island chain and also the closest of the Channel Islands to the mainland. It is the only one of the Channel Islands to have a non-Spanish-derived name; Anacapa comes from the Chumash word "Anyapax", meaning "illusion". Juan Rodriguez Cabrillo sailed by the island in 1542; George Vancouver labeled the island "Enecapa" on a 1790 chart; the U.S. Coast and Geodetic Survey labeled the island "Anacapa" in 1854. Anacapa Island is home to the Anacapa Island Lighthouse a national historic site.
The island was named by Spanish explorer Sebastián Vizcaíno, who sighted the island on 4 December 1602, the feast day dedicated to Saint Barbara.

The islands are home to an array of significant natural resources and cultural sites; all of the islands contain national archeological districts except Santa Rosa Island. In 1976 all eight of the islands became a biosphere reserve as part of the Man and the Biosphere Programme under UNESCO. 

The National Marine Sanctuary program is part of the National Oceanic and Atmospheric Administration and conducts educational programs, oversees conservation efforts, scientific research, and national resource stewardship. The sanctuary protects a wide range of marine species and more than 150 historic shipwrecks. 

The islands are a place of cultural significance for the Chumash people.

Death Valley

Death Valley National Park straddles the CaliforniaNevada border, east of the Sierra Nevada range. The park contains Death Valley, the northern section of Panamint Valley, the southern section of Eureka Valley, and most of Saline Valley. The Death Valley National Monument was declared in 1933; the park was substantially expanded and became a national park in 1994.
 
Death Valley is the largest national park in the contiguous United States, and the hottest, driest and lowest of all the national parks in the United States. More than 93% of the park is a designated U.S. Wilderness Area. UNESCO included Death Valley as the principal feature of its Mojave and Colorado Deserts Biosphere Reserve in 1984. 

Despite its name, Death Valley National Park is home to a wide variety of plants and animals in its diverse ecosystem and microecosystems. The Death Valley pupfish (Cyprinodon salinus), also known as Salt Creek pupfish, is a small species of fish found only in Death Valley National Park; the pupfish is endemic to two small, isolated locations and is currently classified as an endangered species.

Notable locations inside the park are: Badwater Basin, Dante's View, Darwin Falls, Racetrack Playa, Rainbow Canyon, Telescope Peak, Titus Canyon, and Ubehebe Crater.

Joshua Tree

The Joshua Tree National Park is in southeastern California, east of Los Angeles and San Bernardino, near Palm Springs, California. It takes its name from the Joshua trees (Yucca brevifolia) native to the Mojave Desert.

Minerva Hoyt led a campaign to convince the state and federal governments to protect the area; it was declared a national monument in 1936; The monument was redesignated as a national park on October 31, 1994, by the Desert Protection Act.  The park currently covers an area of over slightly larger than the state of Rhode Island;  of the park is a National Wilderness Preserve. Straddling San Bernardino and Riverside Counties, the park includes parts of both the higher Mojave Desert and the lower Colorado Desert, each containing an ecosystem determined primarily by elevation. The Little San Bernardino Mountains run across the southwest edge of the park.

Notable Joshua Tree scenic areas and trails in the park include: Fortynine Palms Oasis, Hidden Valley (Joshua Tree National Park), Lost Horse Mine, Lost Palms Oasis Trail (Joshua Tree National Park), and Ryan Mountain.

Sequoia and Kings Canyon National Parks
The Kings Canyon National Park and Sequoia National Park adjoin each other and are administered together by the National Park Service as Sequoia and Kings Canyon National Parks.

Kings Canyon

Kings Canyon National Park is located in the southern Sierra Nevadas, in Fresno and Tulare counties.

Originally established in 1890 as General Grant National Park, created to protect a small area of giant sequoias from logging, the park was greatly expanded and renamed to Kings Canyon National Park on March 4, 1940. The park is also a national wilderness area. Kings Canyon is north of and contiguous with Sequoia National Park, and both parks are jointly administered by the National Park Service as the Sequoia and Kings Canyon National Parks.

The park consists of two main areas: General Grant Grove, home of the General Grant tree and Cedar Grove. The park's namesake, Kings Canyon, is a rugged glacier-carved valley more than a mile (1,600 m) deep. Other natural features include multiple  peaks, high mountain meadows, swift-flowing rivers, and some of the world's largest stands of giant sequoia trees. The canyon is drained by the Middle and South Forks of the Kings River. Kings Canyon is home to over 60 recreational trails; combined the Pacific Crest Trail and the John Muir Trail traverse the entire length of the park, from north to south.

Sequoia

Sequoia National Park is in the southern Sierra Nevada, northeast of Bakersfield, California. Because the parks are adjacent to each other, Kings Canyon National Park and Sequoia National Park are administered together as the Sequoia and Kings Canyon National Parks by the National Park Service;. In 1976, UNESCO designated the park as the Sequoia-Kings Canyon Biosphere Reserve.

The park is home to the highest mountain in the contiguous United States, Mount Whitney. Approximately 85 percent of the Sequoia and Kings Canyon National Parks is a wilderness area inaccessible by road. The majority of the national park was designated as part of the Sequoia-Kings Canyon Wilderness area in 1984 and the southwest portion of the park was protected as the John Krebs Wilderness in 2009. 

The park is known for the giant sequoia trees it is named after, including the General Sherman tree, by volume the largest tree on Earth. The General Sherman tree grows in an area of the park called the Giant Forest, which contains five of the ten largest trees in the world. The Giant Forest is connected by the Generals Highway to General Grant Grove in Kings Canyon National park, home of the General Grant tree which is one of the other largest giant sequoias in existence.

Lassen Volcanic Park

Lassen Volcanic National Park is located in Lassen County in northeastern California and is known for its numerous volcanoes. The namesake feature of the park is Lassen Peak, the largest plug dome volcano in the world and the southernmost volcano in the Cascade Range. The park is one of the few areas in the world where all four types of volcano can be found: plug dome, shield, cinder cone, and stratovolcano. From May 1914 until 1917, a series of eruptions occurred on Lassen.

Lassen Volcanic National Park began in 1907 as two separate national monuments: Cinder Cone National Monument and Lassen Peak National Monument. Because of the recent volcanic activity and the area's scenery, Lassen Peak, Cinder Cone, and the area surrounding were established as a National Park on August 9, 1916.

The source of heat for the volcanism in the Lassen area is subduction of the Gorda Plate diving below the North American Plate off the Northern California coast. The area surrounding Lassen Peak is still active with boiling mud pots, fumaroles, and hot springs.

Pinnacles

Pinnacles National Park is a mountainous area located east of the Salinas Valley in Central California. The park is in the southern portion of the Gabilan Range, part of California's Coast Ranges. Pinnacles is the ninth location in California to become part of the National Park System. The park is also home to Pinnacles National Monument, an area of spirelike rock formations in the Gabilan Range area.

The park's is named for the eroded rocky spires which are the remnants of an ancient volcanic field. The majority of the park is also protected as a national wilderness. The park is divided by rock formations into eastern and western areas, connected by hiking trails. The rock formations provide for extensive views that attract rock climbing enthusiasts. The park features talus caves which are home to at least thirteen different species of bats; the park is an excellent habitat for prairie falcons, and is a protected release site for California condors hatched in captivity.

Pinnacles was established under the Antiquities Act as a national monument in 1908 by President Theodore Roosevelt, and was redesignated as a national park by Congressional legislation in 2012 that was signed into law by President Barack Obama on January 10, 2013. The legislation designates the Pinnacles Wilderness as the Hain Wilderness in commemoration of Schuyler Hain's efforts to establish the national monument.

Redwoods

The Redwood National and State Parks are a network of three state and one national park located along the coast of northern California within Del Norte and Humboldt Counties. The National Park Service and the California Department of Parks and Recreation administratively merged responsibility Redwood National Park with the three abutting Redwood State Parks in 1994 to streamline administration, forest management and resource stabilization. 

The park network includes:
 Redwoods National Park
 Del Norte Coast Redwoods State Park
 Jedediah Smith Redwoods State Park
 Prairie Creek Redwoods State Park

Humboldt Redwoods State Park and Big Basin Redwoods State Park are California state Redwood parks which are part of the Northern California coastal forests, but are not a part of the Redwood National and State Parks complex.

Today the parks protect the remaining Redwood forest area, a combined  area of old-growth temperate rainforests. Coastal redwoods are among the tallest, oldest, and most massive tree species on Earth.

After decades of unrestricted logging, efforts toward conservation of the Redwood forest started. The work of the Save the Redwoods League, founded in 1918 to protect the remaining old-growth redwoods, resulted in the creation of the several state parks. Efforts by the Save the Redwoods League, the Sierra Club, and the National Geographic Society to create a national park began in the early 1960s and Redwood National Park was created in 1968. The parks are currently managed jointly by the California Department of Parks and Recreation and the National Park Service.

The Redwood National and State Parks are one of twentyfour World Heritage Sites in the United States; the committee overseeing the evaluation noted the existence of over fifty prehistoric archaeological sites and the research on the area by Humbolt State University. The park is also a part of the California Coast Ranges International Biosphere Reserve.

In addition to protecting the redwoods, the ecosystem of the parks protect a number of threatened species such as the tidewater goby, Chinook salmon, northern spotted owl, and Steller's sea lion, while providing educational programs and recreation facilities and numerous hiking and walking trails throughout the park.

Yosemite

Yosemite National Park is located in central California in the western Sierra Nevada; the park borders the Sierra National Forest to the southeast and Stanislaus National Forest to the northwest and extends Tuolumne, Mono, Madera, and Mariposa counties. Three wilderness areas adjoin the park: the Ansel Adams Wilderness to the southeast, the Hoover Wilderness to the northeast, and the Emigrant Wilderness to the north. The name "Yosemite" means "killer" in Miwok, and originally referred a tribe that was forced out of the area by the Mariposa Battalion. Previously, the area had been called "Ahwahnee" ("big mouth") by indigenous people. The indigenous tribe that lived in the Valley were called Yosemites by other tribes because they were formed of renegades from the Paiutes. The term "Yosemite" in Miwok is easily confusable with a similar term for "grizzly bear". 

Almost the entire park is designated as a wilderness area; the park contains multiple ecosystems such as chaparral and oak woodland, lower montane forest, upper montane forest, subalpine zone, and alpine and protects a wide biological diversity of flora and fauna native to California and the Sierra Nevada. Yosemite is one of twentyfour World Heritage Sites in the United States.

Yosemite was at the heart of the development of the national park system. Galen Clark worked together with other conservationists to protect Yosemite Valley from development; this ultimately lead President Abraham Lincoln to sign the Yosemite Grant Act in 1864. The movement to have Congress declare Yosemite a national park began soon after the grant and the valley and surrounding mountains and wilderness became a national park in 1890.

Notable areas protected inside Yosemite include: Tunnel View, El Capitan, Sentinel Dome and Half Dome, Tuolumne Meadows, Dana Meadows, Clark Range, Cathedral Range, and Kuna Crest.

About the National Park Service

The National Park Service (NPS) is the agency of the United States Government that manages all national parks, many national monuments, and other historical properties with various designations. The agency was created on August 25, 1916 through the National Park Service Organic Act. The National Park Service is a part of the Department of the Interior. The agency is charged with both preserving the ecological and historical integrity of the places entrusted to its management and also making them available and accessible for public use and enjoyment.

See also

 California Desert Protection Act of 1994
 List of national parks of the United States
 List of National Historic Landmarks in California
 National Register of Historic Places listings in California
 U.S. Wilderness Area
 National Wilderness Preservation System
 Marine protected area
 National park
 United States Forest Service
 National forest (United States)
 Bureau of Land Management
 Antiquities Act
 Theodore Roosevelt
 John Muir

References

General references

 Barbour, M. G., Lydon, S., Borchert, M., Popper, M., Whitworth, V., & Evarts, J. (2001). Coast Redwood: A Natural and Cultural History. Cachuma Press.
 Chiles, F. (2015). California's Channel Islands. University of Oklahoma Press.
 Cunningham, B., & Cunningham, P. (2006). Hiking California's Desert Parks: A Guide to the Greatest Hiking Adventures in Anza-Borrego, Joshua Tree, Mojave, and Death Valley. Globe Pequot.
 Dilsaver, L. M., & Tweed, W. C. (1990). Challenge of the Big Trees. National Park Service.
 Dilsaver, L. M. (2015). Joshua Tree National Park: A History of Preserving the Desert. National Park Service.
 Dunning, J., & Thron, D. (1998). From the Redwood Forest: Ancient Trees and the Bottom Line: A Headwaters Journey. Chelsea Green Pub Co.
 Eggers, M. (2004). Mining History and Geology of Joshua Tree National Park. San Diego Association of Geologists.
 Harris, A. G., Tuttle, E., & Tuttle, S. D. (1997). Geology of National Parks (5th revised edition). Kendall Hunt Publishing Company.
 Harris, D. (1995). The Last Stand: The War Between Wall Street and Main Street over California’s Ancient Redwoods. Crown Publishing.
 Hewes, J. J. (1995). Redwoods: The World’s Largest Trees. Smithmark Pub.
 Johnstone, P., & Palmquist, P. E. (Eds.). (2001). Giants in the Earth: The California Redwoods. Heyday Books.
 Kaiser, J. (2010). Joshua Tree: The Complete Guide (4th edition). Destination Press.
 Kiver, E. P., Harris, D. V. (1999). Geology of U.S. Parklands (5th edition). John Wiley & Sons.
 League, S. the R., & Hodder, S. (2019). The Once and Future Forest: California’s Iconic Redwoods. Heyday Books.
 Maloof, J. (2016). Nature’s Temples: The Complex World of Old-Growth Forests. Timber Press.
 Mihaly, C. (2018). California's Redwood Forest. Focus Readers.
 Morley, J. M. (1992). Muir Woods: The Ancient Redwood Forest Near San Francisco. Smith/Morley.
 Noss, R. F. (Ed.). (1999). The Redwood Forest: History, Ecology, and Conservation of the Coast Redwoods. Island Press.
 Rothman, H. K., & Miller, C. (2013). Death Valley National Park: A History. University of Nevada Press.
 Schaffer, J. P. (1999). Yosemite National Park: A Natural History Guide to Yosemite and Its Trails. Berkeley: Wilderness Press.
 Schoenherr, A. A., Feldmeth, C. R., & Emerson, M. J. (1999). Natural History of the Islands of California. University of California Press.
 Sharp, R. P., & Glazner, A. F. (1997). Geology Underfoot in Death Valley and Owens Valley. Mountain Press Publishing Company.
 Vieira, L. (1994). The Ever-Living Tree: The Life and Times of a Coast Redwood. Walker & Co.
 Wallace, W. J. (1978). Ancient peoples and cultures of Death Valley National Monument (1st edition). Acoma Books.
 Wuerthner, G. (1994). Yosemite: A Visitor's Companion. Stackpole Books.
 Zarki, J. W. (2015). Images of America: Joshua Tree National Park. Arcadia Publishing.

Notes

Citations

Other sources

External links
General
National Parks in California; Visit California.
Map and list of national parks, monuments, and historic sites in California, National Park Service
Map of Northern California; University of Texas
Map of Southern California; University of Texas

Parks
 1920s photographs of Death Valley and surrounding area; Digital History Collections, Utah State University.
 Historic Photos of Yosemite National Park, Brigham Young University.

parks
parks
parks
parks
parks